Pretty Ladies is a 1925 American silent comedy drama film starring ZaSu Pitts and released by Metro-Goldwyn-Mayer. The film is a fictional recreation of the famed Ziegfeld Follies. Directed by Monta Bell, the film was written by Alice D. G. Miller and featured intertitles by Joseph Farnham. Pretty Ladies originally featured musical color sequences, some in two-color Technicolor. However, the color sequences are now considered lost.

Plot
As described in a film magazine reviews, Maggie, a homely but lovable musical comedy star yearns for love, a home, and children. She marries Al Cassidy, a happy-go-lucky fellow. Her happiness is complete at the birth of a baby. Her husband leaves on business and gets into trouble with another woman. A friend of Maggie’s informs her of this. When her husband begins to confess, she seals his lips, declaring everything untrue and foolish.

Cast

Production
The film was set in New York City shot at MGM Studios in Culver City, California. The film's sets were designed by the art directors James Basevi and Cedric Gibbons.

Pretty Ladies marked the first credited appearance of "Lucille Le Sueur", soon to be known as Joan Crawford. According to Lawrence J. Quirk, author of The Films of Joan Crawford, this film was the only time Crawford was credited by her real name (Crawford is also billed as LeSueur in the 1925 promotional film MGM Studio Tour).
It was also one of the first screen appearances of Myrna Loy (then still performing under her real last name Williams), who signed a seven-year contract with Warner Bros. in 1925 and then finally signed with MGM where she became a star in 1934 with the release of The Thin Man.

See also
 List of early color feature films

References

External links

Stills and lobby cards at www.gettyimages.com
Stills at normashearer.com
Joan Crawford's costume at silenthollywood.com
 (53 minute version)

1925 films
1925 comedy-drama films
1920s color films
1920s English-language films
American silent feature films
Films set in New York City
Films shot in Los Angeles
Metro-Goldwyn-Mayer films
Silent films in color
American black-and-white films
Early color films
1920s American films
Silent American comedy-drama films